The Elective Governor Act may refer to:

 The Puerto Rico Elective Governor Act of 1947
 The Elective Governor Acts of 1968 dealing with Guam and the United States Virgin Islands